Anthonius Hubertus "Bart" Carlier (23 June 1929 – 4 May 2017) was a Dutch professional footballer who played as a striker. He spent eight seasons in France, winning league championships with AS Monaco in 1961 and 1963. Carlier appeared for the Dutch national team five times, scoring two goals.

Club career
A left-sided striker, Carlier played the majority of his career in France, starting there at a time professional football was not allowed in Holland. When it was introduced, he returned to Limburg to play for big spending Fortuna '54 alongside star players Cor van der Hart, Bram Appel and Frans de Munck.

International career
Carlier made his debut for the Netherlands in a November 1955 friendly match against Norway and earned a total of 5 caps, scoring 2 goals. His final international was a November 1957 friendly against Belgium.

Personal life
Carlier lost his almost his entire family in 1944, when they were killed during a bombing of Venlo in World War II. Carlier died on 4 May 2017, aged 87.

References

External links
 
 
 
 

1929 births
2017 deaths
Association football forwards
Dutch footballers
Netherlands international footballers
VVV-Venlo players
1. FC Köln players
FK Pirmasens players
RC Strasbourg Alsace players
Fortuna Sittard players
AS Monaco FC players
Eredivisie players
Ligue 1 players
Dutch expatriate footballers
Expatriate footballers in France
Expatriate footballers in Monaco
Expatriate footballers in Germany
Dutch expatriate sportspeople in France
Dutch expatriate sportspeople in Monaco
Dutch expatriate sportspeople in Germany
Footballers from Venlo
20th-century Dutch people